The Lara Fútbol Club was a professional football club based in Barquisimeto, Lara, that was promoted to the Primera División in 1965, in their first year of existence. In 2012, due to strong financial problems, the team moved to the city of Los Teques, and subsequently to Caracas and changed its name to Metropolitanos Fútbol Club. Metropolitanos currently plays in the Venezuelan Primera División.

History
In the 1965 Copa Venezuela, the club was defeated by Valencia in the finals.

In the 1966 Copa Libertadores, the club participated in the Group A with Boca Juniors, River Plate, Universitario, Deportivo Italia, and Alianza Lima, and was the last place with only four points.

In the 1968 Copa Venezuela, the club was defeated by Unión Deportiva Canarias in the finals.

In the 1979 Copa Venezuela, the club was defeated by Deportivo Galicia in the finals.

Honours
Primera División Venezolana
Professional Era (1): 1965

Copa de Venezuela: 0
Runner-up (3): 1965, 1968, 1979

Performance in CONMEBOL competitions
Copa Libertadores: 1 appearance
1966: Group Stage

See also
Venezuelan Primera División

External links

Association football clubs established in 1965
Football clubs in Venezuela
1965 establishments in Venezuela
Sport in Barquisimeto